is a Neptune trojan, first observed by the Sloan Digital Sky Survey Collaboration at Apache Point Observatory, New Mexico, on 12 September 2006. It was the fifth and largest such body discovered, approximately 180 kilometers in diameter. , it is 30.3 AU from Neptune.

Orbit and classification 

Neptune trojans are resonant trans-Neptunian objects in a 1:1 mean-motion orbital resonance with Neptune. These trojans have a semi-major axis and an orbital period very similar to Neptune's (30.10 AU; 164.8 years).

 belongs to the leading  group, which follow 60° ahead Neptune's orbit. It orbits the Sun with a semi-major axis 29.925 AU of at a distance of 29.0–30.9 AU once every 163 years and 8 months (59,793 days). Its orbit has an eccentricity of 0.03 and an inclination of 8° with respect to the ecliptic.

Physical characteristics 

The discoverers estimate that  has a mean-diameter of 180 kilometers based on a magnitude of 22.0. Based on a generic magnitude-to-diameter conversion, it measures approximately 130 kilometers in diameter using an absolute magnitude of 7.5 with an assumed albedo of 0.10.

Numbering and naming 

Due to its orbital uncertainty, this minor planet has not been numbered and its official discoverers have not been determined. If named, it will follow the naming scheme already established with 385571 Otrera, which is to name these objects after figures related to the Amazons, an all-female warrior tribe that fought in the Trojan War on the side of the Trojans against the Greek.

References

External links 
 AstDys-2 about 
 
 

613490
20060912